United Nations Security Council Resolution 1908, adopted unanimously on January 19, 2010, after endorsing the Secretary-General's recommendation, the Council increased the size of the United Nations Stabilization Mission in Haiti (MINUSTAH) established under Resolution 1542 (2004), in the aftermath of the 2010 Haiti earthquake. The resolution authorised an additional 3,500 peacekeepers for Haiti, bringing the total number of MINUSTAH troops to 8,940 and a police component to 3,711.

The resolution also expressed sympathy and solidarity to those affected by the earthquake.

The Force consists of troops from up to 17 countries, including Argentina, Bolivia, Canada, Jordan, France, South Korea and the United States, and police from 41 countries, including Argentina, Bangladesh, Brazil, Egypt, Russia and Spain.

The month's President of the Council, Zhang Yesui of the People's Republic of China, said that the adoption of the resolution would be important for maintaining peace and stability, supporting relief efforts and helping to restore post-disaster reconstruction.

See also 
 Humanitarian response to the 2010 Haiti earthquake
 List of United Nations Security Council Resolutions 1901 to 2000 (2009–2011)

References

External links 
 
Text of the Resolution at undocs.org

 1908
2010 Haiti earthquake relief
2010 in Haiti
 1908
January 2010 events